Mansfield is an unincorporated community in Mansfield Township, Freeborn County, Minnesota, United States.

Notes

Unincorporated communities in Freeborn County, Minnesota
Unincorporated communities in Minnesota